500 Miles may refer to:

"500 Miles", or "500 Miles Away from Home", a song made popular in the U.S. and Europe during the 1960s folk revival
"I'm Gonna Be (500 Miles)", a 1988 song by The Proclaimers
"500 Miles", a song by Tori Amos from the 2009 album Abnormally Attracted to Sin
 Five Hundred Miles (film), a 2023 Chinese film

See also

"500 Miles High", a 1973 jazz fusion song by Chick Corea and Return to Forever
500 Miles High (Flora Purim album), 1974
500 Miles to Memphis, an Americana punk band 
Race of Two Worlds, or 500 Miles of Monza, an Italian automobile race 1957 and 1958